Jazem Kol (also Romanized as Jāzem Kol) is a village in Rahmatabad Rural District, Rahmatabad and Blukat District, Rudbar County, Gilan Province, Iran. At the 2006 census, its population was 36, in 12 families.

References 

Populated places in Rudbar County